Evergestis extimalis is a species of moth of the family Crambidae. It is found in the Palearctic.

The wingspan is 27–31 mm. The forewings are pale ochreous-yellow, darker terminally ; lines and discal spot hardly darker, marked with a few fuscous dots ; a brown terminal suffusion, more or less strongly dilated towards middle;cilia fuscous. Hindwings prismatic yellow -whitish ; termen yellower, brownish-tinged. The larva is pale yellow ; dorsal line darker ; lateral pale
purple ; spots on lateral line black ; head black.

The moth flies from June to September depending on the location.

The larvae feed on Brassicaceae species preferring the seed-heads.

References

External links
 Lepidoptera of Belgium
 waarneming.nl 

Evergestis
Moths described in 1763
Moths of Asia
Moths of Europe
Taxa named by Giovanni Antonio Scopoli